South Dakota Highway 445 (SD 445), also known as Deadwood Avenue, is a  north–south state highway in Rapid City, South Dakota. Lying in the northwestern corner of the city, it connects Interstate 90 (I-90) with the downtown area.

Route description

SD 445 begins at an intersection with SD 231 (W Chicago Street / W Omaha Street) in Rapid City's Westside, just across Rapid Creek and the Dakota Hogback from downtown. It heads northwest as a four-lane undivided highway to pass through an industrial area. The highway curves more northward, passing the former Lien Airport as it travels through a more commercial district. SD 445 narrows to two-lanes immediately before coming to an end at its interchange with I-90 / US 14 / SD 79 (exit 55); Deadwood Avenue continues north. The entire length of SD 445 lies within the Rapid City city limits.

All of SD 445 is legally defined via South Dakota Codified Law § 31-4-243.

Major intersections

References

445
Transportation in Rapid City, South Dakota